Aigen im Mühlkreis is a town and a former municipality in Rohrbach District in the Austrian state of Upper Austria.  On 1 May 2015 Aigen im Mühlkreis municipality was merged with Schlägl to form Aigen-Schlägl municipality.

As of 1 January 2018, population of the town was 1778.

Geography
Aigen im Mühlkreis lies in the upper Mühlviertel.

Personalities
It is  the site of Nicholas Treadwell's gallery.

Economy
Aigen D.M. is one of the industries related to Aigen.

References

Cities and towns in Rohrbach District